Acceleration in Monza was the fourth weekend of Acceleration 2014, a multi-day festival combining top class car and bike racing with live music and other entertainment. The festival was organised by the International Sport Racing Association (ISRA), based in the Netherlands, to be held six times in 2014, starting 25–27 April in Portimao, Portugal and ending 17–19 October in Assen, Netherlands. The various racing competitions were
Formula Acceleration 1 (FA1), the MW-V6 Pickup Series, the Legend SuperCup (LSC), the European Stock 1000 Series (ACC 1000) and the European Stock 600 Series (ACC 600).

Every driver entering Acceleration 2014 was eligible for points in the drivers' championship as well as the nations' championship. As for music and entertainment, David Hasselhoff was the host of "Celebrate the 80's and the 90's with The Hoff", a dance party featuring 2 Unlimited, Haddaway, and others. Saturday evenings were filled with performances of international DJs.

FA1 results

Driver changes
Marco Barba replaced Oliver Campos-Hull at Acceleration Team Spain. Felix Rosenqvist came back to the Swedish team, taking over from Jimmy Eriksson. Steijn Schothorst made his debut in the series, in a car run by the Venezuelan Team Lazarus, which also employed Dennis Lind. With Armando Parente missing in Monza, Schothorst raced for China.

Free practices

Qualifying sessions

Qualifying 1:
 #4 – lap time in which track limits were disrespected was cancelled
 #17 – lap time in which yellow flags were disrespected was cancelled

Race 1

Race 2

 #39 – 25 second drive-through penalty for unsafe release during pit stop

Drivers' championship standings after 8 out of 10 races

Teams' championship standings after 8 out of 10 races

MW-V6 results

Free practices

Qualifying sessions

Race 1

Race 2

 #44 – 25 second drive-through penalty

Race 3

Drivers' championship standings after 12 out of 18 races

Nations' championship standings after 12 out of 18 races

Legend SuperCup results

Free practices

Race 1

Race 2

Race 3

Race 4

Drivers' championship standings after 16 out of 24 races

Nations' championship standings after 16 out of 24 races

References

Main source
Raceresults.nu

Other references

Monza
Acceleration